Ta Tit Yan is a village in Tai Po District, Hong Kong.

Administration
Ta Tit Yan is one of the villages represented within the Tai Po Rural Committee. For electoral purposes, Ta Tit Yan is part of the Tai Po Kau constituency, which is currently represented by Patrick Mo Ka-chun.

Ta Tit Yan is a recognized village under the New Territories Small House Policy.

See also
 Tai Po River

References

External links

 Delineation of area of existing village Ta Tit Yan (Tai Po) for election of resident representative (2019 to 2022)
 Antiquities Advisory Board. Historic Building Appraisal. Kwun Yam Temple, Ta Tit Yan Pictures

Villages in Tai Po District, Hong Kong